Cymbopetalum costaricense is a species of plant in the family Annonaceae.  The specific epithet refers to the country of Costa Rica which is in the plant's range.  It grows as a tree.

The flowers of Cymbopetalum costaricense and related species C. penduliflorum were traditionally used by indigenous peoples to flavor chocolate.

References

External links
 
 

costaricense
Spices
Inflorescence vegetables
Chocolate